Kokot is a Slavic surname. Notable people with the surname include:

 Franciszek Kokot (1929–2021), Polish nephrologist and endocrinologist
 Manfred Kokot (born 1948), East German athlete
 Aleš Kokot (born 1979), Slovenian footballer

See also
 
 Kokotović

Polish-language surnames
Slovene-language surnames